Bathyphantes is a genus of  dwarf spiders that was first described by Anton Menge in 1866.

Species
 it contains fifty-seven species and one subspecies:
B. alameda Ivie, 1969 – USA, Canada
B. alascensis (Banks, 1900) – USA, Canada
B. alboventris (Banks, 1892) – USA, Canada
B. approximatus (O. Pickard-Cambridge, 1871) – Europe, Caucasus, Russia (Europe to Middle Siberia)
B. bishopi Ivie, 1969 – USA
B. bohuensis Zhu & Zhou, 1983 – China
B. brevipes (Emerton, 1917) – USA, Canada
B. brevis (Emerton, 1911) – USA, Canada
B. canadensis (Emerton, 1882) – Russia (Middle Siberia to Far East), Canada, USA
B. chico Ivie, 1969 – USA
B. diasosnemis Fage, 1929 – USA
B. dubius Locket, 1968 – Angola
B. eumenis (L. Koch, 1879) – USA (Alaska), Canada, Czech Rep., Poland, Finland, Russia (Europe to Far East), China
Bathyphantes e. buchari Ruzicka, 1988 – Central Europe
B. fissidens Simon, 1902 – Argentina
B. floralis Tu & Li, 2006 – Laos, Vietnam
B. glacialis Caporiacco, 1935 – Karakorum
B. gracilipes van Helsdingen, 1977 – St. Helena
B. gracilis (Blackwall, 1841) (type) – North America, Europe, Northern Africa, Turkey, Caucasus, Russia (Europe to Far East), Kazakhstan, China, Korea, Japan
B. gulkana Ivie, 1969 – Russia (Far East), USA (Alaska), Canada
B. helenae van Helsdingen, 1977 – St. Helena
B. hirsutus Locket, 1968 – Congo
B. humilis (L. Koch, 1879) – Russia (Europe to Far East)
B. iviei Holm, 1970 – USA (Alaska)
B. jeniseicus Eskov, 1979 – Finland, Russia (West Siberia to Far East)
B. keeni (Emerton, 1917) – Canada, USA
B. larvarum Caporiacco, 1935 – Karakorum
B. latescens (Chamberlin, 1919) – USA
B. lennoxensis Simon, 1902 – Argentina
B. mainlingensis Hu, 2001 – China
B. malkini Ivie, 1969 – USA, Canada
B. menyuanensis Hu, 2001 – China
B. minor Millidge & Russell-Smith, 1992 – Borneo
B. montanus Rainbow, 1912 – Australia (Queensland)
B. nangqianensis Hu, 2001 – China
B. nigrinus (Westring, 1851) – Europe, Russia (Europe to South Siberia)
B. ohlerti Simon, 1884 – Poland
B. orica Ivie, 1969 – USA, Canada
B. pallidus (Banks, 1892) – USA, Canada
B. paracymbialis Tanasevitch, 2014 – China, Laos, Myanmar, Thailand, Malaysia, Indonesia (Sumatra)
B. paradoxus Berland, 1929 – Samoa
B. parvulus (Westring, 1851) – Europe, Russia (Europe to Far East), China
B. pogonias Kulczyński, 1885 – Russia (Far East), USA (Alaska)
B. rainbowi Roewer, 1942 – Australia (Lord Howe Is.)
B. reprobus (Kulczyński, 1916) – North America, Northern Europe, Russia (Europe to Far East)
B. reticularis Caporiacco, 1935 – Karakorum
B. robustus Oi, 1960 – Korea, Japan
B. sarasini Berland, 1924 – New Caledonia
B. setiger F. O. Pickard-Cambridge, 1894 – Europe, Russia (Europe to Far East)
B. similis Kulczyński, 1894 – Europe, Turkey
B. tagalogensis Barrion & Litsinger, 1995 – Philippines
B. tongluensis Chen & Song, 1988 – China
B. umiatus Ivie, 1969 – USA (Alaska)
B. vittiger Simon, 1884 – France
B. waneta Ivie, 1969 – USA, Canada
B. weyeri (Emerton, 1875) – USA
B. yodoensis Oi, 1960 – Korea, Japan
B. yukon Ivie, 1969 – USA (Alaska)

See also
 List of Linyphiidae species
 Pimoa

References

External links
Image of a female Bathyphantes alascensis from Washington

Araneomorphae genera
Cosmopolitan spiders
Linyphiidae